Ancients of Ooga is a 2.5D puzzle-platform game developed by NinjaBee and Bacon Wrapped Games for the Xbox Live Arcade. It was released on June 30, 2010 for Xbox Live and on May 20, 2011 for Windows.

Plot

The story follows the Spirit of Ooga in the quest to help the Oogians exact revenge on the Boolis, after they tricked them into thinking their chiefs were evil, leading the Boolis to burn them.

Gameplay
Ancient of Ooga is a side-scrolling puzzle platformer where the player controls the Spirit, who can possess the other Oogians. Oogians are separated into tribes, each with different abilities, with the chief of each tribe having enhanced versions of those abilities. In addition to these special abilities, all Oogians have the ability to swallow and vomit certain objects on the ground. This can be useful as when you are holding an item, you cannot climb a ladder, and cannot hold another item, but you can hold an item in your hands and in your stomach simultaneously, which is useful in certain situations. Near the end of the game, all of the tribe leaders join together to summon the Ancient One at a Bone Fire, who is actually just an average human that the Oogians worship.

Release 
The main game is available on the Xbox Live Arcade and Steam, as well as a paid downloadable expansion pack named The Forgotten Chapters, which was released for the Xbox version of the game on May 18, 2011. It follows a spin-off story that shows some of the tribes that were cut from the main game by the developers.

Reception 

Reviews of this game are mixed to good with Metacritic giving it a 69%. IGN gave the game a 7.5/10.

References

External links 
 

NinjaBee games
2010 video games
Video games developed in the United States
Windows games
Xbox 360 Live Arcade games
Puzzle-platform games
Multiplayer and single-player video games